Omer Mahy (4 August 1895 – 15 June 1980) was a Belgian racing cyclist. He rode in the 1927 Tour de France.

References

1895 births
1980 deaths
Belgian male cyclists
Place of birth missing